Lesedi Alton Kapinga (born 25 May 1995) is a South African professional soccer player who plays as a midfielder for South African Premier Division side Mamelodi Sundowns.

Career
Having started his senior career at Tshakhuma Tsha Madzivhandila, he joined Black Leopards in the summer of 2018. His performances in the 2019–20 season attracted praise and interest from larger clubs. In the summer of 2020, Kapinga joined Mamelodi Sundowns on a five-year deal.

Personal life
Kapinga is a cousin of the late Orlando Pirates striker Lesley Manyathela. He is from Limpopo province, a town called Musina. He is teammate with his hometown friend Khuliso Mudau.

Career statistics

References

Living people
1995 births
South African soccer players
Association football midfielders

Black Leopards F.C. players
National First Division players
South African Premier Division players